Hesperia attalus, the dotted skipper, is a butterfly in the family Hesperiidae (skippers). It was described by William Henry Edwards in 1871 and is found in North America.

Subspecies
The following subspecies are recognised:
Hesperia attalus attalus (W. H. Edwards, 1871)
Hesperia attalus nigrescens Gatrelle, 1999 – dark dotted skipper
Hesperia attalus slossonae (Skinner, 1871) – Slosson's dotted skipper

References

Further reading
 Hodges, Ronald W., et al., eds. (1983). Check List of the Lepidoptera of America North of Mexico, xxiv + 284.
 Opler, Paul A. (1999). A Field Guide to Western Butterflies, Second Edition, xiv + 540.
 Pelham, Jonathan P. (2008). "A catalogue of the butterflies of the United States and Canada with a complete bibliography of the descriptive and systematic literature". Journal of Research on the Lepidoptera, vol. 40, xiv + 658.
 Arnett, Ross H. (2000). American Insects: A Handbook of the Insects of America North of Mexico. CRC Press.

External links
Butterflies and Moths of North America

Hesperia (butterfly)